Manuscript Studies is a biannual peer-reviewed academic journal in the  field of palaeography. It was established in 2016 and is published by the University of Pennsylvania Press. The editors-in-chief are Nicholas Herman and Lynn Ransom.

Abstracting and indexing
The journal is abstracted and indexed in the Emerging Sources Citation Index, Modern Language Association Database, and Scopus.

References

External links 

Publications established in 2016
University of Pennsylvania Press academic journals
Biannual journals
English-language journals
History journals